Platycarpum is a genus of flowering plants belonging to the family Rubiaceae.

Its native range is Southern Tropical America.

Species:

Platycarpum acreanum 
Platycarpum decipiens 
Platycarpum duckei 
Platycarpum eglandulosum 
Platycarpum egleri 
Platycarpum froesii 
Platycarpum loretensis 
Platycarpum maguirei 
Platycarpum negrense 
Platycarpum orinocense 
Platycarpum rhododactylum 
Platycarpum rugosum 
Platycarpum schultesii 
Platycarpum vriesendorpiae

References

Rubiaceae
Rubiaceae genera